Stygian Abyss may refer to:

Ultima Underworld: The Stygian Abyss, 1992 video game developed by Blue Sky Productions
Ultima Online: Stygian Abyss, 2009 video game developed by Electronic Arts